Giuseppe Laguidara (16971742) was an Italian sculptor of the Baroque period, active in his native Naples.  He became a pupil of Lorenzo Vaccaro. He is described as sculpting figures of shepherds and shepherdesses for church nativity scenes  (presepi). He was called to restore statues for the Neapolitan King, but due to an "exotic nature" he lost this employment. He is said to have died from inebriation.

Notes

References

1697 births
1742 deaths
17th-century Neapolitan people
18th-century Neapolitan people
18th-century Italian sculptors
Italian male sculptors
18th-century Italian male artists